Alfredo Lorenzo Mendoza Jarencio (born September 5, 1964) is a Filipino basketball coach and former professional basketball player. He is the head coach for the UST Growling Tigers of the University Athletic Association of the Philippines (UAAP). He also acts as the team manager for the NorthPort Batang Pier of the Philippine Basketball Association (PBA).

He was the head coach of the University of Santo Tomas Growling Tigers Senior men's collegiate basketball team of the University Athletic Association of the Philippines from 2006 to 2013.

Known as "the Fireman" when he was actively playing in the PBA, he distinguished himself as one of the league's best three-point shooters, especially in clutch situations.

Early life

Jarencio hails from Sigma, Capiz, where his father, Benedicto Mariveles Jarencio, a civil engineer, ran a construction business. He, along with his four siblings grew up in Project 3 in Quezon City.

His first sport was volleyball where he was once named Athlete of the Year while still in grade school. He attended high school at Quirino High School in Quezon City, where he began to play basketball.

Collegiate & amateur career

Jarencio played college basketball for the UST Glowing Goldies during the 1980s under coaches Charlie Badion and Aric del Rosario.

He was a walk-in applicant for the Glowing Goldies after unsuccessfully trying out for Turo Valenzona's Trinity College team in the NCAA. He was able to secure a roster spot in UST, besting 200 other aspirants for a slot reserved for only four freshmen players.

He once scored 50 points in a game against the National University Bulldogs in 1982, during the elimination round of UAAP Season 45. He scored 48 points during the 1984 UAAP Finals against the University of the East Warriors after exchanging baskets with season MVP Allan Caidic, who in turn finished the game with 46 points.

Jarencio played in the Philippine Amateur Basketball League from 1984 to 1986 and was part of the San Miguel franchise team, Magnolia Ice Cream. The team, under the name Lagerlite Beer finished as runners-up to ESQ Marketing in the 1985 Invitational Cup.

The team changed their name back to Magnolia Ice Cream and they exacted revenge on ESQ by beating them in the finals of the 1986 Founder's Cup.

Jarencio was included in the lineup of the Danding Cojuangco-backed Northern Cement basketball team that won the 1985 Asian Basketball Confederation Championship in Kuala Lumpur, Malaysia.

The NCC team which had two American players in their roster also competed as a guest team and won the 1985 PBA Reinforced Conference title.

Professional career

Jarencio turned professional in 1986, joining the Magnolia Cheese Makers who had taken leave from the PBA when the events related to the EDSA revolution unfolded. The team, under new owners returned in the Third Conference after signing up Jarencio together with 7 of his teammates from the NCC national team. He won his first championship as a professional player in the Reinforced Conference the following year.

He is considered a journeyman, having played in six different teams in his 16 years in the PBA. In his first six years, Jarencio had played as a reserve until he became part of the starting lineup in Ginebra.

After being traded to Great Taste from San Miguel Beer in 1988, he was given longer playing minutes as backup to starting point guard Bernie Fabiosa. On June 30, 1988, during the All-Filipino Conference. Jarencio threw a buzzer-beating jumper to win the game against Purefoods, 102–100.

Ironically, he was traded to Purefoods the following year and was again relegated to a reliever role, playing behind point guards Al Solis and Dindo Pumaren. He was released to the expansion draft and was picked up by Pop Cola in the off-season. He became the second leading scorer for the team, behind Elmer Reyes, with a 12.1 point per game average in the 35 games that he played.

Jarencio's break came when he joined Sonny Jaworski's team and became Ginebra's starting point guard. He had been traded from Swift in 1992 and became the leading scorer for the team that season. He had an average of 18.6 points per game. He scored 45 points against 7 Up, 44 against Swift and scored over 30 points in four other contests during the season. He was awarded the PBA's Most Improved Player at the end of the season.

He won his third championship in the PBA in the 1997 Commissioner's Cup with Ginebra, which had used the name Gordon's Gin Boars at the start of the season. He made 8 three point shots in the semifinals to beat San Miguel in two overtime periods. He then made 7 three point shots in their finals match against Alaska.

Jarencio had amassed 6,121 career points after his last active year in 2001, ranking him 49th in the PBA All Time Scoring Leaders list.

Selected statistics

a

Coaching career

UST Growling Tigers
Jarencio was appointed head coach of the UST Growling Tigers on February 21, 2006. He replaced Nel Parado whose contract expired on February 15. Parado coached the Tigers for two years, but only managed to get four wins in each of the seasons that they competed in.

On his 16th season as a player in the PBA, his team, the Pop Cola Panthers was disbanded after the PBA franchise was sold by RFM Corporation to Coca-Cola Bottlers Philippines, Inc. This left Jarencio with no PBA team to play in and was put on inactive status. During those times, he joined the San Miguel All-Stars touring team that played goodwill games around the country.

In 2003, Jarencio had gone to UST to accompany his daughter in her enrollment and bumped into Institute of Physical Education and Athletics (IPEA) director Fr. Ermito de Sagon. Aric del Rosario had just resigned and the school was searching for their new head coach. Jarencio had no prior coaching experience so he declined Fr. de Sagon's invitation. Gina Francisco, the UST senior women's basketball team captain when Jarencio was still playing for the Glowing Goldies, persisted in convincing him to apply for the head coach position. She referred him to UST athletics moderator Mike Silbor who arranged an interview with Fr. de Sagon. He passed the interviews and was later given a one-year contract with an understanding for him to rebuild the Growling Tigers' basketball program for the next three years.

In his first season as head coach in 2006, he led the Growling Tigers in defeating the heavily favored Ateneo Blue Eagles 2–1 to win the UAAP Season 69 title, something that has eluded his playing career as a Glowing Goldie.

The Growling Tigers got into the UAAP finals two more times, in 2012, and in 2013, but they had not been successful in duplicating their feat in 2006. In eight seasons with Jarencio as coach, UST missed the final four on just two occasions, in 2008, and in 2010. The team also won the PCCL championship in 2012.

Jarencio resigned in 2013, at the end of UAAP Season 76, after failing to win the championship against La Salle. He had accepted an offer to coach a PBA team near the end of the first conference that year. He ended his eight-year coaching stint for the Tigers with an overall record of 56 wins against 54 losses in the elimination round, 10–8 in the postseason, highlighted by six final four and three finals appearances.

GlobalPort/NorthPort
During the years that Jarencio was coaching the Growling Tigers, he was also an assistant coach of the San Miguel Beermen in the PBA. An altercation with Yeng Guiao, his former coach at Swift became a defining low point in his coaching career.

In game six of the 2006 Philippine Cup semifinals series between San Miguel and Red Bull, Guiao threw an elbow at San Miguel player Dondon Hontiveros, who was backing up in his direction after converting a three-point jump shot. Out of anger, Jarencio, charged towards the Red Bull bench and almost came into contact with Guiao, which happened in front of the referees.

Guiao was ejected from the game after incurring two technical fouls and was later handed down a one-game suspension and a P30,000 fine. Jarencio was called for one technical foul and was later meted a P50,000 fine for improper contact with an official and also a one-game suspension.

On January 9, 2014, before the start of the Commissioner's Cup, GlobalPort officially signed Jarencio to a two-year contract. He took over interim coach Richie Ticzon, who earlier replaced head coach Junel Baculi prior to his firing at the start of the season.

In his first conference as GlobalPort coach, he posted a 1–8 win–loss record.  He ended his first season as a PBA coach with a 2–16 win–loss record.

He was fired towards the end of the 2014–15 PBA Philippine Cup despite doubling his win total in his first two conferences in the pro league at 4 wins and 5 losses. He remained with the team as a consultant. On March 31, 2015, Jarencio was reappointed as the head coach of the Batang Pier.

In 2013, it was reported that Jarencio will take over as coach of the Barako Bull Energy Boosters, but contract negotiations fell through. 

Jarencio also coached the House of Representatives Solons team in the UNTV Cup from 2016 to 2018.

In January 2023, NorthPort named Jarencio as their team manager, replacing Bonnie Tan, who then became their interim head coach.

Post-PBA playing career 
Jarencio played in an exhibition game in the UNTV Cup 3rd Season. The game was a PBA Legends charity match in support of Samboy Lim's medical recovery.

Career as sports administrator 
He was appointed commissioner of the Community Basketball Association (CBA) in 2018. He is also the commissioner of the Metro Basketball Tournament (MBT), a tournament for boys aged 16 years and below in Metro Manila.

He was also the commissioner of NAASCU for the 17th season of their basketball tournament.

Personal life

Jarencio was featured in the 1990 Fernando Poe, Jr. film, "May Isang Tsuper Ng Taxi" (Pablo S. Gomez, Pablo Santiago, FPJ Productions, Inc.) in a cameo role along with other PBA players. They played a group of cab drivers who came to aid FPJ and engaged the villains in a fistfight.

He ran and lost in the 2004 elections as Councilor in the 3rd district of Manila.

Coaching record

College

Professional 

a
b
c

References

1964 births
Living people
Barangay Ginebra San Miguel players
Filipino men's basketball coaches
Great Taste Coffee Makers players
Magnolia Hotshots players
Philippine Basketball Association All-Stars
Philippines men's national basketball team players
Filipino men's basketball players
Pop Cola Panthers players
San Miguel Beermen players
Shooting guards
Tanduay Rhum Masters players
UST Growling Tigers basketball players
UST Growling Tigers basketball coaches
San Miguel Beermen coaches
NorthPort Batang Pier coaches